Christian Mark (born 24 December 1962 in Innsbruck, Tyrol) is an Austrian bobsledder who won competed during the 1980s. He won a silver medal in the four-man event at the 1986 FIBT World Championships in Königssee.

Competing in two Winter Olympics, Mark earned his best finish of sixth in the four-man event at Calgary in 1988.

References
 1984 bobsleigh two-man results (todor66.com)
 1984 bobsleigh four-man results (todor66.com)
 1988 bobsleigh two-man results (todor66.com)
 1988 bobsleigh four-man results (todor66.com)

External links
 
 

1962 births
Living people
Austrian male bobsledders
Austrian male sprinters
Bobsledders at the 1984 Winter Olympics
Bobsledders at the 1988 Winter Olympics
Sportspeople from Innsbruck
Olympic bobsledders of Austria